The Denver Millennium Bridge is the world's first cable-stayed bridge using post-tensioned structural construction. Its 200-foot (61 m) white tapered steel mast rises above Denver's northwestern skyline, connected to the bridge deck and foundation anchored by steel cables. The footbridge crosses railroad tracks and the regional light rail system, climbing no higher than 25 feet (8 m) above street level, thereby minimizing the height pedestrians must climb.

Located near LoDo (Denver's lower downtown), in Riverfront Park, the Millennium Bridge connects the popular 16th Street Mall with the Commons Park in the Central Platte Valley District of the Union Station neighborhood. The bridge is the first of three pedestrian bridges between Downtown Denver and the Highland neighborhood.

Design
The name, Denver Millennium Bridge, honors a milestone in time and in Denver's architectural development. To meet the structural challenge of spanning 130 feet (40 m) without a steep increase in elevation, the deck's structure must be as thin as possible while remaining stable. This cable-stayed bridge uses a steel frame that derives its stiffness from tension by using a single mast that is tilted toward one end of the bridge. Cables supporting the bridge deck are welded to both sides of the mast, but cable to foundation anchors attach to the mast only from the side of the bridge toward which the mast is tilted.

Supportive tension is created by using the mast as a lever to pull the deck up into a shallow arc, keeping the opposite end of the bridge secured by two steel rods. With the mast raised, concrete was poured onto the metal deck frame, pushing the deck into place and applying tension to the cables. The post-tensioned structural construction allows for a substantially thinner 6-inch-thick reinforced concrete slab-on-metal deck. The deck structure is supported by secondary I-Beams, and has an average width of 80 feet (24 m).

History
Preliminary work on the $9-million footbridge began in 1999. The structural and civil engineering firm Ove Arup & Partners, in conjunction with the architectural design company ArchitectureDenver, developed the design.

Contractor Edward Kraemer & Sons, Inc. implemented the design, subcontracting Colorado Bridge and Iron to fabricate the steel components. The mast was constructed of cone-shaped steel plate sections welded together to form a 3-foot (1 m) base, 7-foot (2 m) midsection and 1.5-foot (.5 m) tip diameter.

Glass-enclosed elevator towers on both ends of the footbridge accommodate pedestrians who have difficulty climbing the stairs leading up to either end of the bridge from street level. The Millennium Bridge was completed and officially opened by Denver Mayor Wellington Webb on April 22, 2002.

On April 24, 2014, a $1-million renovation began on the footbridge to increase pedestrian accessibility to the bridge, which allows for smoother access between downtown Denver and the Central Platte Valley and Lower Highlands neighborhoods.  Part of this renovation includes modifications to the east staircase and an upgrade to LED lighting, which will allow for the colors to be changed and increase energy efficiency by up to 80%.

See also
Platte River Bridge
Highland Bridge

Awards
2002 Urban Design Merit Award, Denver Chapter American Institute of Architects
Gold Award, New York Association of Consulting Engineers "Engineering Excellence Awards 2003"

Photo gallery

References

Wagner, Hol “Millennium Bridge Rising in Denver’s Central Platte Valley”, Rocky Mountain Construction (August 27, 2001)
“Mast-Raising Creates New Denver Landmark” (June 22, 2001) Colorado Construction—Newswatch
“Innovative Engineering in Colorado” Engineer It! Innovative Engineering in Colorado Denver Museum of Nature & Science
“Raising the Mast on Denver Millennium Bridge” (July 27, 2001) Arup
“Denver Millennium Bridge Opens” (April 26, 2002) Arup
“Standout Mast is up on Denver Millennium Bridge” (June 25, 2001) Arup
Collis, Hugh (September 2003) "Denver Millennium Bridge, Colorado, USA 1999 - 2002" Transport, Engineering and Architecture. Burlington, MA: Architectural Press. 
Eddy, John "Denver Millennium Bridge", The Arup Journal, 2003, n. 1 v. 38 .

Cable-stayed bridges in the United States
Pedestrian bridges in Colorado
Towers in Colorado
Transportation buildings and structures in Denver
Buildings and structures celebrating the third millennium
Steel bridges in the United States